Piccaire was a small settlement located on Long Island, Hermitage Bay, just west of Gaultois, Newfoundland and Labrador. It had a population of 75 in 1956.

See also
 List of communities in Newfoundland and Labrador

Ghost towns in Newfoundland and Labrador